Hot Numbers is a band from Spain that was formed in 1996. Their music is based on the fusion of musical genres such as ska, reggae, punk and different types of rock.

History 
The band was started by a group of friends who loved hot and Caribbean rhythms such as ska, reggae, and calypso. Their decision to start composing and writing music started as a hobby and later turned into a profession.

The group started in the world of entertainment in 1996.

Their first concerts include "Rosaleda", and "Dr. Martens First International Ska Festival”. Hot Numbers performed in Balaguer (their hometown), where they played with well known groups The Malarians and Skatalites.

In 2000 the singer decided to temporarily leave the band, but returned months later, allowing the group to grow musically. Hot Numbers then re-entered into the musical world with new strengths, songs, and ideas. They participated in initiatives and concerts such as "Festimal" and "Fino's Reggae".

In 2002, the singer left the band for good. For the third time, they returned to the music market, held concerts, and participated in festivals such as "Arritmia".

In 2008, Hot Numbers did the Girats '08 tour, where they performed in many different Spanish cities, some being Barcelona, Terrassa, Madrid, Gelida, Lleida, and Solsona.

In 2009 they toured Tàrrega, Balaguer, Miralcamp, Malgrat de Mar, Rasquera, and Gelida.

One night in 2009, after long meetings, beer, and some coffee, Hot Numbers decided it was time to record something serious.

They collected money and time, and after being in the rehearsal room for a long time, with the help of a new producer, they recorded "No ha costat tant...!" in the El Tostadero  studio. They then came out with their first CD, released under the label Shimauma Records, in Barcelona.

In 2010, they performed their album "No ha costat tant...!" in Linyola, Lleida, Sant Martí de Maldà, Balaguer, and Santa Coloma de Queralt.

"No ha costat tant...!" is a summary of recent years and it has both metaphorical and ironic meanings.

The album contains 11 multilingual tracks, where the band invested time, experience, miles, and a part of themselves. With many influence from rock, punk, pop, and especially ska music, the album is danceable, fast, meaningful, and above all, full of hope.

Hot Numbers has shared the stage with bands like Discípulos de Otilia, Color Humano, La Thorpe Brass, Potato, Komando Moriles, Bad Manners, Skaparàpid, Dr. Calypso, The Kluba, Kayo Malayo, La Pegatina, Melendi, Els Pets and El Gitano de Balaguer.

The group is influenced by ska and modern Californian bands like Reel Big Fish and Save Ferris, of whom they do some covers.

Hot Numbers’ current band numbers include Anna Roset (main vocal), Orix Morelló (bass & vocals), Skaro Clotet (guitar & vocals), Rays Llavall (trumpet), Sisco Casals (trombone & vocals), Oriolet Puig (alto & baritone saxophone), Xesco Sauret (drums), and Dani Paniagua (keys).

Discography 
No ha costat tant...! (Shimauma Records, 2010)

References

External links 
  Official Hot Numbers' Website 
 Hot Numbers' Contact
 Hot Numbers' Facebook
 YouTube Channel

Musical groups from Catalonia
Spanish ska groups